Studzianka may refer to the following places:
Studzianka, Greater Poland Voivodeship (west-central Poland)
Studzianka, Lublin Voivodeship (east Poland)
Studzianka, Podlaskie Voivodeship (north-east Poland)
Studzianka, Warmian-Masurian Voivodeship (north Poland)
 Studzianka, today Studyanka (:uk:Студянка), Ukraine
 Studzianka (:be:Студзянка), Belarus